The 2022 America East Conference women's soccer tournament was the postseason women's soccer tournament for the America East Conference held from October 30 through November 6, 2023. The five-match tournament took place at campus sites, with the higher seed hosting. The six-team single-elimination tournament consisted of three rounds based on seeding from regular season conference play. The defending champions were the Vermont Catamounts, who were unable to defend their title after not qualifying for the tournament. New Hampshire won their second tournament in program history after a penalty shoot-out victory in the final.  It was the second victory for ninth year head coach Steve Welham. As tournament champions, New Hampshire earned the America East's automatic berth into the 2022 NCAA Division I women's soccer tournament.

Seeding 
The top six teams in the regular season earned a spot in the tournament.  No tiebreakers were required as each team finished with a unique regular season record.

Bracket

Schedule

Quarterfinals

Semifinals

Final

Statistics

Goalscorers

All-Tournament team 

Source:

MVP in bold

References 

 
America East Conference Women's Soccer Tournament